Manu Joseph (born 22 July 1974) is an Indian journalist and writer. He is the former editor of Open magazine.

Life and career
Manu was born in Kottayam, Kerala, and grew up in Chennai. His father Joseph Madapally is a film maker who directed the Malayalam film Thoranam. He is a graduate of Loyola College, Chennai, and dropped out of Madras Christian College to become a staff writer at Society magazine. He is a former editor of OPEN magazine, and a columnist for The International New York Times and The Hindustan Times. In 2007, he was a Chevening Scholar. He currently lives in Delhi. His debut novel Serious Men (2010) won The Hindu Literary Prize and the PEN/Open Book Award. It has been adapted by Sudhir Mishra as a feature film.

His second novel, The Illicit Happiness of Other People, was published in September 2012. He also wrote the screenplay for the film Love Khichdi (2009).

In January 2014, Manu resigned as editor of Open magazine.

Manu is the creator and writer of Decoupled, an Indian English-language comedy web series, which was released on Netflix on 17th December, 2021.

Awards and honours
2010: The Hindu Literary Prize won for Serious Men
2010: Man Asian Literary Prize shortlisted for Serious Men
2010: Huffington Post′s 10 best books of the year for Serious Men
2011: Bollinger Everyman Wodehouse Prize shortlisted for Serious Men
2011: PEN Open Book Award won for Serious Men
2013: The Hindu Literary Prize shortlisted for The Illicit Happiness of Other People

Works 
 Serious Men. HarperCollins India, 2010. .  
 The Illicit Happiness of Other People. Fourth Estate, 2012. .
Miss Laila, Armed and Dangerous, Myriad Editions, 2017. .

References

External links

"Can you take it Manu Joseph?" newslaundry.com, 19 July 2012.
Huffington Post interview, 18 September 2010.

1974 births
Journalists from Kerala
Writers from Kottayam
Living people
Loyola College, Chennai alumni
Indian male journalists
Indian male screenwriters
Novelists from Kerala
Indian male novelists